Basaglia is an Italian surname. Notable people with the surname include:

Franco Basaglia (1924–1980), Italian psychiatrist, neurologist, and professor
Maria Basaglia (1912–1998), Italian director and screenwriter

Italian-language surnames